The Pacific elaenia (Myiopagis subplacens) is a species of bird in the family Tyrannidae. It is found in Ecuador and Peru. Its natural habitats are subtropical or tropical dry forests and subtropical or tropical moist lowland forests.

References

Pacific elaenia
Birds of Ecuador
Birds of Peru
Birds of the Tumbes-Chocó-Magdalena
Pacific elaenia
Pacific elaenia
Taxonomy articles created by Polbot